The Best of the Post is a syndicated anthology drama television series adapted from stories published in the Saturday Evening Post magazine. It was produced by John J. Enders and hosted by John Conte. A total of 26 half-hour episodes, all in color, aired from 1960 to 1961  with stars that included Marie Windsor, Pat O'Brien, Charles Coburn, Peter Lorre, Bonita Granville, Buddy Ebsen, and Vincent Price.

Ted Post was the director. The programs were produced by Jack Wrather Productions, with ITC handling distribution. A "large-scale promotional blitz" by the Post helped to pave the way for stations to broadcast the show.

References

External links

The Best of the Post at CVTA with list of episodes

The Saturday Evening Post
1960 American television series debuts
1961 American television series endings
1960s American anthology television series
First-run syndicated television programs in the United States
Television series by MGM Television
Television series by ITC Entertainment